Yoshihiko Takahashi (高橋 慶彦, born March 13, 1957) is a Japanese former professional baseball shortstop in Nippon Professional Baseball (NPB). He played for the Hiroshima Toyo Carp from 1976 to 1989, Lotte Orions in 1990 and the Hanshin Tigers from 1991 to 1992. He was the Japan Series MVP in 1979. He holds the NPB record for consecutive games with a hit at 33, between June and July 1979.

References

1957 births
Living people
Baseball people from Hokkaido
Japanese baseball players
Nippon Professional Baseball shortstops
Hiroshima Toyo Carp players
Lotte Orions players
Hanshin Tigers players
Japanese baseball coaches
Nippon Professional Baseball coaches